Wild West Whoopee is a 1931 American pre-Code Western film directed by Robert J. Horner and starring Jack Perrin, Josephine Hill and Buzz Barton.

Cast
 Jack Perrin
 Josephine Hill
 Buzz Barton
 Fred Church
 Horace B. Carpenter
 John Ince 
 George Chesebro
 Henry Roquemore
 Ben Corbett
 Charles Austin 
 Walter Patterson

References

Bibliography
 Michael R. Pitts. Poverty Row Studios, 1929–1940: An Illustrated History of 55 Independent Film Companies, with a Filmography for Each. McFarland & Company, 2005.

External links
 

1931 films
1931 Western (genre) films
American Western (genre) films
Films directed by Robert J. Horner
1930s English-language films
1930s American films